The Ambassador Extraordinary and Plenipotentiary of the Russian Federation to the Holy See is the official representative of the President and the Government of the Russian Federation to the Pope in his capacity as Bishop of Rome, head of the Catholic Church, and head of state of the Vatican City.

The post of Russian Ambassador to the Holy See is currently held by Aleksandr Avdeyev, incumbent since 13 January 2013. In common with many representatives to the Holy See, the ambassador and his staff live and work outside the Vatican City, in Rome. Since 1992 the ambassador to the Holy See has also held the post of representative to the Sovereign Military Order of Malta.

History of diplomatic relations

Formal diplomatic relations between the Holy See and the Soviet Union were only established in 1990, shortly before the dissolution of the Soviet Union. Representatives continued to be appointed by the USSR's successor state, the Russian Federation, and in 2010 the level of relations was raised to that of the exchange of embassies.

List of representatives (1990 – present)

Representatives of the Soviet Union to the Holy See (1990 – 1991)

Representatives of the Russian Federation to the Holy See (1991 – present)

References

 
Holy See
Russia|